Moses Thomas "Moe" Croghan (November 19, 1914 — February 7, 1979) was a Canadian professional ice hockey player who played 16 games in the National Hockey League with the Montreal Maroons during the 1937–38 season. The rest of his career, which lasted from 1934 to 1941, was spent in senior and minor leagues. Croghan was born in Montreal, Quebec.

Career statistics

Regular season and playoffs

External links 
 

1914 births
1979 deaths
Anglophone Quebec people
Canadian ice hockey defencemen
Montreal Maroons players
Providence Reds players
Quebec Aces (QSHL) players
Ice hockey people from Montreal
Springfield Indians players